Eteoneus is a genus of lace bugs in the family Tingidae. There are at least 20 described species in Eteoneus.

Species
These 23 species belong to the genus Eteoneus:

References

Further reading

 
 
 
 
 
 
 
 
 
 
 

Tingidae
Articles created by Qbugbot